Jörg Dresel (born 25 December 1968) is a German water polo player. He competed at the 1992 Summer Olympics and the 1996 Summer Olympics.

References

External links
 

1968 births
Living people
German male water polo players
Olympic water polo players of Germany
Water polo players at the 1992 Summer Olympics
Water polo players at the 1996 Summer Olympics
Sportspeople from Hagen